Calliotropis cynee is a species of sea snail, a marine gastropod mollusc in the family Eucyclidae.

Description
The length of the shell reaches 17 mm.

Distribution
This marine species occurs off Indonesia.

References

 Vilvens C. (2007) New records and new species of Calliotropis from Indo-Pacific. Novapex 8 (Hors Série 5): 1–72

External links
 

cynee
Gastropods described in 2007